Mithun Chowdhury Mithun (born 10 February 1989) is a Bangladeshi footballer who last played as a striker for Farashganj SC in the Bangladesh Championship League. He also represented the Bangladesh national team and made his international debut in 2009. He captained the U23 team against Kuwait in 2012 Olympic Football Qualifiers. In 2014 FIFA World Cup Football Qulifiers, his maiden international goal broke the deadlock of the match against Lebanon in second half in a memorable 2–0 win at Dhaka. On 16 June 2014, Mithun scored 5 goals in a single match against for Sheikh Russel KC against newly promoted side Uttar Baridhara Club, in the 2013–14 Bangladesh Premier League.

References

Living people
1989 births
Bangladeshi footballers
Bangladesh international footballers
Bangladeshi Hindus
Abahani Limited (Dhaka) players
Muktijoddha Sangsad KC players
Sheikh Russel KC players
Mohammedan SC (Dhaka) players
Farashganj SC players
Footballers from Dhaka
People from Narayanganj District
Association football forwards
Footballers at the 2006 Asian Games
Footballers at the 2010 Asian Games
Asian Games competitors for Bangladesh
South Asian Games gold medalists for Bangladesh
South Asian Games medalists in football